The 1975–76 Nationale A season was the 55th season of the Nationale A, the top level of ice hockey in France. Chamonix Hockey Club won their 29th league title.

Final ranking
 1st place: Chamonix Hockey Club
 2nd place: Sporting Hockey Club Saint Gervais
 3rd place: Gap Hockey Club
 4th place: Ours de Villard-de-Lans
 5th place: Club des Sports de Megève
 6th place: Viry-Châtillon Essonne Hockey
 7th place: CSG Grenoble
 8th place: CPM Croix
 9th place: Français Volants
 10th place: Diables Rouges de Briançon

External links
List of French champions on hockeyarchives.info

Fra
1975–76 in French ice hockey
Ligue Magnus seasons